The Illinois Auditor General is a legislative officer provided for by the Constitution of Illinois and appointed by the Illinois General Assembly for a 10-year term.  The office reviews all Illinois state spending for legality.

See also
 Illinois Auditor of Public Accounts — a pre-1973 elected constitutional office
 Illinois Treasurer

References

External links 
 

Auditor General
Auditor General
State auditors and comptrollers of the United States